Cosmopolis XXI was a late 2000s Russian concept launch vehicle billed as a space tourism vehicle, similar to Mojave Aerospace's Tier One program. Designed and built by the Myasishchev Design Bureau, it would use the M-55X launch aircraft (derived from Myasishchev M-55), and the proposed C-21 spaceplane or its successor the Explorer. It would be a TSTSO (Two-Stage to SubOrbit) launch platform.

The Explorer spaceplane is a suborbital tourist spaceplane based on the  C-21 design. The plane was being developed by Space Adventures with the Russian Federal Space Agency and was intended to carry 3 passengers. It is to be air-launched by carrier aircraft from a Space Adventures spaceport.  Space Adventures abandoned the Explorer project in 2010 because "it got too expensive."  It is unclear if Russia continues its development.

References 
Space.com Suborbital Rocketship Fleet to Carry Tourists Spaceward in Style  February 22, 2006

External links
 Space Tourism Pioneers, Space Adventures and the Ansari X Prize Title Sponsors, to Provide First Suborbital Spaceflight Tourism Vehicles (SpaceAdventures)
 New group to develop passenger spaceship (MSNBC)
 C-21 Spacecraft at Space Adventures

Myasishchev aircraft
Human spaceflight programs
Space Adventures
Space tourism